Boydsville may refer to:

Boydsville, Kentucky and Tennessee
Boydsville, Missouri